The Harvard–Yale Regatta or Yale-Harvard Boat Race (often abbreviated The Race) is an annual rowing race between the men's heavyweight rowing crews of Harvard University and Yale University. First contested in 1852, it has been held annually since 1859 with exceptions during major wars fought by the United States and the COVID-19 pandemic. The Race is America's oldest collegiate athletic competition, pre-dating The Game by 23 years. It is sometimes referred to as the "Yale-Harvard" regatta, though most official regatta programs brand it "Harvard-Yale."

Originally rowed on Lake Winnipesaukee, New Hampshire, it has since moved to the Thames River, near New London, Connecticut. Although other locations for the race have included the Connecticut River at Springfield, Massachusetts, and Lake Quinsigamond at Worcester, Massachusetts, the Thames has hosted The Race on all but five occasions since 1878 and both teams have erected permanent training camps on the Thames at Gales Ferry for Yale and at Red Top for Harvard.

The race has been exclusively between Yale and Harvard except for 1897, when the race was held as part of a three-boat race with Cornell on the Hudson River at Poughkeepsie, New York, where, although it lost to Cornell, Yale was deemed the winner of the Harvard-Yale race. Due to the COVID-19, there was no Yale-Harvard Regatta in 2020, the first cancellation since 1945.

History

On May 24, 1843, with the arrival of the shell Whitehall in New Haven, Yale University founded the first collegiate crew in the United States. A year later, Harvard founded their boat club. These boat clubs served primarily a social purpose, until Yale's 1852 issuance of a challenge to Harvard "to test the superiority of the oarsmen of the two colleges". Dr. James M. Whiton (Yale 1853) and Joseph Mansfield Brown (Harvard 1853) were the prime movers in bringing about the race.  The idea of a race was suggested by James N. Elkins, the superintendent of the Boston, Concord and Montreal Railroad, during a train journey with Dr. Whiton.  The first Harvard–Yale Boat Race—and the first American intercollegiate sporting event—took place on August 3, 1852. In this two-mile (3.2 km) contest, Harvard's Oneida prevailed over Yale's Shawmut by about two lengths, with Yale's Undine finishing third. The first place prize was a pair of black walnut, silver-inscribed trophy oars. The trophy oars were awarded to Harvard by General Franklin Pierce who in 1853 became the 14th President of the United States of America. Today, the 1852 trophy oars are the oldest intercollegiate athletic prize in North America.

The Oxford–Cambridge Boat Race is the only longer side-by-side rowing event in the world, though slower stream makes the Yale–Harvard Race one to three minutes longer.

Originally the race was just between the varsity crews but there are now three events: the 2-mile (3.2-km) freshman race, the 3-mile (4.8-km) junior varsity race, and the 4-mile (6.4-km) varsity race. The varsity crews compete for the Sexton Cup, the junior varsity for the F. Valentine Chappell Trophy, and the freshman for the New London Cup. The Hoyt C. Pease and Robert Chappell Jr. Trophies are awarded to the team that wins the majority of the three races.

Typically the day before the freshman, junior varsity and varsity races, there is a two-mile (3.2 km) race between the spares for both crews. These "combination" boats are made up of second freshman boat and third varsity boat rowers (i.e. the "combi" or "combo" race).  The winner of this race gets the James P. Snider Cup, as well as the right to paint its school's colors on the "rock" at Bartlett's Cove for the next day's races.
Currently Harvard leads the varsity series at 95–55, the second varsity (JV) at 75–38, and the freshman series at 72–39–1. Yale holds the upstream course record with its time of 18:35.8 in 2015. The Crimson set the downstream—and Thames River course—mark of 18:22.4 in 1980.

Trophies

The Sexton Cup is presented to the winner of the varsity heavyweight race. The trophy is actually a combination of two former rowing trophies: The bottom is the original base of the Sexton Cup, with year-by-year results of race winners, while the upper portion retains the Yale and Harvard seals from the trophy which was awarded to the winner of the (now discontinued) graduate eights race.

The F. Valentine Chappell Trophy is presented to the winner of the second varsity heavyweight race. Previously used for a discontinued event in this regatta, it was redesignated in 1983 to be awarded to the victor in the junior varsity contest.

The New London Cup is presented to the winner of the freshman race. The city of New London donated this silver award in celebration of its bicentennial and it is inscribed with the Seal of the City of New London and engraved with a ship bearing "Mare Liberium" (Freedom of the Seas). As of 2014, both schools began boating a 3V lineup for this race, rather than an all-freshmen lineup.

The Hoyt C. Pease and Robert Chappell Jr. Trophy is presented to the crews who win two or more of the varsity, junior varsity, and freshmen races. This sterling silver bowl was donated by George Pew, Yale Class of 1958, in honor of Pease and Chappell with the inscription: "Named in honor of their great contribution over four decades to the spirit and success of The Boat Race."

The James Snider Cup is awarded to the winning crew of the Combination race of the Harvard–Yale Regatta, which is held annually in New London, Connecticut. The Combination crews are typically composed of rowers from the third varsity and second freshman boats of their respective programs. Traditionally the two crews race a 2-mile (3.2-km) course the day before the Regatta, with the winning crew earning both possession of the Cup and the right to paint the large rock surface south of Bartlett's Cove—typically the most popular viewing spot for the Regatta's main events the next day—with their school's colors.

The James P. Snider Cup was dedicated in honor of James P. "Jamie Sniderman" Snider by the Yale Heavyweight Crew Class of 2005 following the Harvard–Yale Regatta held on June 11, 2005. The cup was donated in honor of Jamie's years of dedicated service to both the Yale Heavyweight Crew and the Yale Crew program as a whole. In 1995 and 1996 Jamie served as an assistant coach of the Yale Women's Crew, leading the 1995 Third Varsity to a 10–4 record. After becoming an assistant with the Men's Heavyweight squad, Jamie led the 1997 Third Varsity Crew to an undefeated season, an Eastern Sprints Gold Medal, and a victory in the Combination Race of the Harvard–Yale Regatta. Jamie's 1999 Combination crew earned the right to paint the rock as well. Currently, Jamie serves as the assistant coach of the Women's Program. In 2006 he led his Third Varsity Four to a third-place finish at the Eastern Sprints, and in 2007, 2008, 2009 he coached the Varsity Four to gold medals at Eastern Sprints and a sixth, sixth and third-place finish at NCAAs.

In addition to coaching Yale crews during the season, Jamie has served as caretaker of Gales Ferry, the home and training site for the Yale Men's Heavyweight Crew during preparation for the Harvard–Yale Regatta since 1878. He has also served as Director of the Yale University Community Rowing Program since its inception in the summer of 1999. Originally established as a small pilot program, the program has since grown to include over 100 youth participants annually, providing rowing opportunities for organizations such as the National Youth Sports Program, American School for the Deaf, and the Connecticut Special Olympics.

Results

Varsity race

Number of wins: Harvard, 95; Yale, 59
Most consecutive victories: Harvard, 18 (1963–1980)
Course downstream record: Harvard, 1980 – 18 min 22.4 sec; average speed 
Course upstream record: Yale, 2022 – 18 min 17.5 sec; average speed 
Narrowest winning margin: 0.2 sec (Yale, 1914)
Largest winning margin: 1 min 43 sec (Harvard, 1879)

a.  Yale ran into Harvard, which was leading at the turning stake.

b.  Yale collided with Harvard.

c.  Yale stroke broke oar and dove overboard. Yale still won the race.

d.  Triangular races included Cornell. Cornell won.

e.  Yale stroke ejected from shell near three-mile mark.

f.  Shortest race in series history.

g.  Yale's seven seat lost oar and dove overboard at two-mile mark.

h.  The Harvard boat swamped in rough conditions, and the race was abandoned with Yale ahead. The race was declared to have no official result in January 2017, following an appeal.

Junior Varsity race

Number of wins: Harvard, 77; Yale, 40
Most consecutive victories: Harvard, 9 (1967-1975)
Narrowest winning margin: 0.2 sec (Yale, 1952)
Largest winning margin: 1 min 20.5 sec (Yale, 1981)

Freshman/Third Varsity race

Number of wins: Harvard, 75; Yale, 40 (1 dead heat)
Most consecutive victories: Harvard, 11 (1965-1976)
Narrowest winning margin: 0.4 sec (Yale, 1935)
Largest winning margin: 46 sec (Harvard, 1940)

a.  Final time an entry was composed entirely of freshmen.

b.  Yale's 3V8 competed in this event.

4V | Combination Race

Begun in 1920, the combination boat is crewed by rowers from the third varsity and second freshman boats, the strongest substitutes available to the junior varsity and freshman boats.

Number of wins: Harvard, 18; Yale, 5

a.  This was the inaugural contest for the James P. Snider Cup.

See also

 Head of the Charles Regatta
 Intercollegiate Rowing Association
 National Collegiate Rowing Championship
 The Boat Race between Oxford and Cambridge (UK)
 The Great Race between University of Waikato and a prominent university team (or teams) from outside New Zealand (New Zealand)

Notes

References

Citations
Lewis, Guy. The Beginning of Organized Collegiate Sport, American Quarterly, Vol. 22, No. 2, Part 1. (Summer, 1970), pp. 222–229.

Further reading
 Mendenhall, Thomas C. The Harvard–Yale Boat Race 1852–1924 and the coming of sport to the American college (Mystic Seaport Museum, 1970)
 Whiton, James M. "The First Harvard–Yale Regatta". Outlook LXVIII (June 1901): 286-89.

External links

 Harvard Men's Heavyweight Crew — one of four Crew subsites
 Yale Heavyweight Crew  — one of three Crew subsites 
 The Calling by Justin Zimmerman — documentary film on the first Regatta and the modern sport of crew

Harvard Crimson
Yale Bulldogs
College rowing competitions in the United States
College sports rivalries in the United States
Recurring sporting events established in 1852
1852 establishments in Connecticut